Urvich is a protected area in the western Balkan Mountains of Bulgaria, encompassing an area of 93.3 hectares. It is located near the fortress of Bozhenishki Urvich within the lands of the village of Bozhenitsa, Botevgrad municipality. It was initially declared a historic site on 24 July 1962 for the conservation of mixed oak forests. It has been re-categorised as a protected area on 18 August 2003.

Within the protected area it is prohibited:
to build quarries and dig up stones;
to make excavations and destroy the fortress wall;
to graze livestock, to hunt, as well as any other activities which destroy or erase the remains of the fortress.

References 

Protected areas established in 1962
1962 establishments in Bulgaria
Protected areas of Bulgaria
Botevgrad Municipality
Balkan mountains